Home, I'm Darling is a play by Laura Wade.

Plot summary 

Judy and Johnny lead a 50’s lifestyle, clothes, décor, appliances. She stays at home while Johnny works as an estate agent. He hopes for a promotion. He realises they have financial problems; the house might be repossessed. Three years earlier Judy had taken voluntary redundancy, but the money has run out. He is underperforming at work and doesn’t earn as much commission. He says he isn’t happy. They need to change. He gets a promotion, but it will involve a long commute. They agree to compromise.

Production history

Theatr Clwyd/National Theatre production 
The play made its world premiere at Theatr Clwyd from 25 June to 14 July 2018, before transferring to the Dorfman Theatre at the National Theatre, London from 24 July to 5 September. The production was directed by Tamara Harvey and starred Katherine Parkinson as Judy. On 31 August, National Theatre artistic director Rufus Norris stepped in to play Johnny after Richard Harrington was left indisposed.

After the original production, it transferred to the Duke of York's Theatre in London's West End from 26 January to 13 April 2019, before embarking on a UK tour to the Theatre Royal, Bath, and The Lowry, Salford, before returning to Theatr Clwyd.

Australian productions 
The play made its Australian premiere at the Melbourne Theatre Company from 20 January to 29 February 2020 at the Southbank Theatre, The Summer, directed by Sarah Goodes and starring Nikki Shiels as Judy.

A production at the Sydney Theatre Company opened at the Drama Theatre at the Sydney Opera House in from 6 April to 15 May 2021, directed by Jessica Arthur and starring Andrea Demetriades as Judy. It was originally due to open in April 2020, however due to the COVID-19 pandemic the production was postponed.

UK Northern Tour 2021 
The play made its regional debut in the UK in a production directed by Liz Stevenson, in a co-production between The Stephen Joseph Theatre in Scarborough, The Octagon in Bolton and Theatre by the Lake in Keswick. The production was in the round, the first time the play had been performed in this configuration.

Cast and characters

Awards and nominations

Original UK/West End production

References

2018 plays
British plays
West End plays
Laurence Olivier Award-winning plays